KGAY (1270 kHz, "106.5 KGAY") is an AM radio station broadcasting to LGBT community with a talk and EDM radio format. Licensed to Thousand Palms, California, United States, it serves the Coachella Valley area. The station is owned by KGAY PSP, a California Benefit Corporation with Bradley Fuhr as CEO. Programming is simulcast on FM translator station 106.5 K293CL, also in Thousand Palms.

History
On December 18, 2013, the then-KFUT changed their format from Spanish oldies to sports, branded as "Fox Sports 1270" in reflection of its Fox Sports Radio affiliation. The station changed to the call sign KFSQ on December 19, 2013, and then to KVGH on February 23, 2016. From April 2016 to January 31, 2017, KVGH was simulcasting a classic hits format with its sister station KVGH-FM (105.1). In November 2016, KVGH rebranded as "Valley 106.5", using the frequency of FM translator K293CL 106.5 FM Thousand Palms.

On December 26, 2018, KVGH changed its format from classic hits to LGBT oriented programming, under the new call sign KGAY. It was owned by Sunnylands Broadcasting LLC, and operated under an LMA agreement with QChella Media, a non-profit formed to serve the LGBTQ community. 

The non-profit was dissolved in 2020, and Sunnylands took over operation until the sale to KGAY PSP on December 31, 2021.

References

External links
FCC History Cards for KGAY

GAY (AM)
Radio stations established in 1965
1965 establishments in California
Dance radio stations
Electronic dance music radio stations
LGBT-related radio stations
Thousand Palms, California